George Miscevich (August 7, 1932 – December 24, 2003) was a former Democratic member of the Pennsylvania House of Representatives.

References

Democratic Party members of the Pennsylvania House of Representatives
2003 deaths
1932 births
20th-century American politicians